The 2004 Czech Figure Skating Championships were held in Hradec Králové between January 8 and 11, 2004. Skaters competed in the disciplines of men's singles, ladies' singles, pair skating, and ice dancing.

Senior results

Men

Ladies

Pairs

Ice dancing

External links
 results

Czech Figure Skating Championships, 2004
Czech Figure Skating Championships
2004 in Czech sport